Camp del Centenari was a stadium in Badalona, Catalonia, Spain.  It was used for football matches and was the home stadium of CF Badalona.  The stadium held 10,000 spectators and was demolished in 2015.

References

External links
Stadium information
Stadium featured on Blog

Camp del Centenari
CF Badalona
Defunct football venues in Spain
Sports venues completed in 1936
Sports venues demolished in 2015
Defunct sports venues in Spain
Demolished buildings and structures in Spain
1936 establishments in Spain
2015 disestablishments in Spain